Francis Balfour may refer to:

Francis Balfour (medical officer) ( 1744–1818), Anglo-Indian medical officer and medical author
Francis Maitland Balfour (1851–1882), British biologist
Francis Balfour (bishop) (1860–1924), assistant bishop of Bloemfontein
Francis Balfour (colonial administrator) (1884–1965), British military officer and colonial administrator